Our Lady of Perpetual Succour High School, also known as OLPS High School, is a school for boys in Chembur, Mumbai, India. The school celebrates its annual feast on 27 June as the feast of Our Lady of Perpetual Help.

It has alumni across industries including the Bollywood film industry, cricket, television, music and authors.

History 
Our Lady of Perpetual Succour High School was established in 1954 by the Redemptorists. The first principal of the school was Fr. Brian McGrath (1930–2019). Dr. Sarto Esteves was the one instrumental in helping the first principal of OLPS High School, Fr. Brian McGrath, an Irish Redemptorist, to raise funds for the school building and this was the beginning of a long association. Our Lady of Perpetual Help is the patron of the school.

Curriculum and activities 

The school is affiliated to the Maharashtra State Board of Secondary and Higher Secondary Education for Class One to Tenth Class. It also has kindergarten and nursery for boys. The medium of instruction is English. 

The students are grouped into four houses: St. Gerard (Blue); St. Alphonsus (Yellow); St. Clement (Green); and St. Anthony (Red).

Sports activities include cricket, football, basketball, kabaddi and volleyball. OLPS students have consistently excelled in sporting events. 

The school band has won many competitions across Mumbai.

Program for Learning Disability 
In 2016, the batch of 1988 funded a program called "Mentoring Champs Learning Center" which caters to children who have various leaning disabilities, from nursery up to 7th standard (10 classes). Between 2016 and 2022 the program supported 195 students.

Staff 
The school is administered by the manager Fr. Louis Menezes CSsR

Secondary section
 Head Mistress – Sr. Sheeja Kunjumon SCB (2022-)

Primary section
 Head Mistress – Sr. Elizabeth Leo (2021-)

Notable alumni 
 Anil Kapoor, actor.
 Shankar Mahadevan, music composer and singer
 Devdutt Pattanaik, author, mythologist, and leadership consultant
 Eijaz Khan, television and film actor
 Armaan Kohli, actor
 Suru Nayak, test cricketer 
 Ram Sampath, music composer
 Aditya Tare, cricketer for Mumbai Indians
 Ajay Jayaram, badminton player

See also 
 List of schools in Mumbai
 Congregation of the Most Holy Redeemer (The Redemptorists, founders of the school)

References 

Educational institutions established in 1957
1957 establishments in Bombay State
Schools in Chembur
High schools and secondary schools in Mumbai